BoBoiBoy is a 
Malaysian animated television series and franchise produced by Animonsta Studios. In this story, a young boy gains superpowers based on elementals, and has the ability to separate into three different personas. With his friends, Yaya, Ying, Gopal and Fang, they form a team and fight to protect the Earth from alien threats who aim to conquer the Earth.

The original series, consisting of three seasons, was aired from March 2011 to June 2016. Its first theatrical film, BoBoiBoy: The Movie, was released on 3 March 2016.

Production 
BoBoiBoy is the first Malaysian release of Animonsta Studios Sdn. Bhd., an animation company established by Nizam Razak with three other partners: Safwan Abdul Karim, Anas Abdul Aziz, and Kee Yong Pin after they left Les' Copaque Production in 2009.

The original concept of the story centres on a coffee-addict alien named Adu Du who has made his way to Earth. A minor change was made later, where instead of coffee, the alien is now in search of cocoa. The change, according to its Facebook fan page, was due to the fact that coffee is a bitter-tasting drink, and does not appeal to children.

The series was released simultaneously in two languages: Malay version and the English version, for the local and international market respectively. Both versions fully utilise different voice actors. In the Malay version, the original voice actor for Upin & Ipin, Nur Fathiah Diaz, was chosen to voice the main character, BoBoiBoy. The series ended after three seasons and was taken up by its sequel, BoBoiBoy Galaxy, starting on 25 November 2016. Unlike any animated TV series in Malaysia, the end credits of the series were written in English instead of Malay, just like Ejen Ali.

Media

Series

The first season of consists of 13 episodes and one special extended finale episode. It started airing on Sunday, 13 March 2011 on TV3. It was shown on Disney Channel Asia starting 11 June 2011, and on NTV7 starting 24 May 2014. The episode starts with the main character, BoBoiBoy on a trip to his grandfather Tok Aba's home in Pulau Rintis for the school holidays. At the same time, Adu Du, an alien from the planet of Ata Ta Tiga heads to Earth, to search for energy resources. He finds out that there is cocoa, a powerful energy source, which had extinct from his planet about 30,000 years ago. Adu Du wanted to conquer all the cocoa for himself so that he could be a hero for his planet. To make sure his plan succeeded, he sought help from the Power Sphere (Ochobot). However, a series of mishaps occur and BoBoiBoy obtains Ochobot instead. Ochobot then gives some superpowers to BoBoiBoy and his new friends, Ying, Yaya and Gopal. Every episode is 22-minutes long and consists of part 1 and 2, each last for 11 minutes. Due to the cartoon's popularity, Animonsta Studios agreed to re-air the final episode with an "Extended Finale" on 1 January 2012.

The second season consists of 13 episodes, it was aired on Sunday, 27 May 2012 on TV3. In this season, BoBoiBoy begins a new chapter of his life as he moves to Pulau Rintis to reunite with Tok Aba Bin Abah Kau, Gopal, Ying and Yaya. The story in this season mainly centres on BoBoiBoy and his friends' life at Pulau Rintis Primary School. BoBoiBoy also encounters a new challenger, Fang at his new school. Fang or Mystery Boy was first introduced in Season 1 on Extended Finale episode. In Season 2 finale BoBoiBoy's friends along with Fang fight a super-powerful alien named Ejo Jo who takes all the power watches except for Fang and Boboiboy, and to defeat him, Fang uses his full power.

The third season consists of 23 episodes, originally airing from January 2014 to June 2016. In this season, BoBoiBoy defeats Ejo Jo, and Adu Du becomes BoBoiBoy's friend but he turns evil back again because of his mother. Boboiboy also gets his new Fire and Water Elemental powers. This is the first season that new episodes would be uploaded onto YouTube before its first airing on TV. It is also the first season to change the theme song, switching out "BoBoiBoy Superhero Kita" ( BoBoiBoy, Our Superhero!) with "Jagalah Bumi" by Kotak.

Film

The first film of the series BoBoiBoy: The Movie was released on 3 March 2016 in Malaysia, 18 March 2016 in Singapore and 13 April 2016 in Indonesia. Taking place after the events of Season 3, the movie brings BoBoiBoy and his friends on an adventure on a mysterious island that houses an ancient Power Sphere older than Ochobot with untold powers. Ochobot has been taken by a new group of enemies called the Tengkotak, led by Bora Ra who attempts to seek out an ancient Power Sphere called Klamkabot. With a budget of RM5 million, it received positive reviews and is a box office success, grossing around RM20 million.

Comics

Characters

Awards
Anugerah Karyawan Animasi

International broadcasts

References

External links
 
 

2010s animated television series
2011 Malaysian television series debuts
2016 Malaysian television series endings
Malaysian children's animated action television series
Malaysian children's animated adventure television series
Malaysian children's animated comic science fiction television series
Malaysian children's animated superhero television series
Animonsta Studios
Child superheroes
Television series about cloning
TV3 (Malaysia) original programming
Animated television series about children